Venison is the meat of a game animal.

Venison may also refer to:

Barry Venison (born 1964), English footballer and television pundit
Venison Island, island in Newfoundland and Labrador, Canada
Venison Tickle, Newfoundland and Labrador, settlement in Newfoundland and Labrador, Canada
Haunch of Venison, art gallery in London, England